Diourbel (Serer: Jurbel, Wolof: Njaaréem) is a town in Senegal lying east of Thiès.  It is known for its mosque and local groundnut industry and is the capital of the Diourbel Region. The population in 2013 was 133,705.

Transport 
Diourbel lies on the N3 road linking it to Dakar and is also served by a junction station on the Dakar-Niger Railway. Both the railway and the N3 cross the River Sine in the town.

Twin towns – sister cities

Diourbel is twinned with:
 Avignon, France

Notable people
Serigne Abdou Ahad Mbacké, the third Mouride caliph, was born in 1914 in Diourbel.

See also 
 Railway stations in Senegal

References 

Diourbel Region
Regional capitals in Senegal
Populated places in Diourbel Region
Communes of Senegal